The 2020–21 Maine Black Bears men's basketball team represented the University of Maine in the 2020–21 NCAA Division I men's basketball season. They played their home games at the Memorial Gymnasium in Orono, Maine and were led by third-year head coach Richard Barron. They were members of the America East Conference. On February 13, 2021, after not being cleared for competition or practice since January 17, the school opted out of the remainder of the season due to challenges due to the ongoing COVID-19 pandemic. They finished the season 2–7, 2–6 in America East play.

Previous season
The Black Bears finished the 2019–20 season 9–22, 5–11 in America East play to finish in eighth place. They lost in the quarterfinals of the America East tournament to Vermont.

Roster

Schedule and results

|-
!colspan=12 style=| Regular season

Source

References

Maine Black Bears men's basketball seasons
Maine Black Bears
Maine Black Bears men's basketball
Maine Black Bears men's basketball
Maine Black Bears